Solving the geodesic equations is a procedure used in mathematics, particularly Riemannian geometry, and in physics, particularly in general relativity, that results in obtaining geodesics. Physically, these represent the paths of (usually ideal) particles with no proper acceleration, their motion satisfying the geodesic equations. Because the particles are subject to no proper acceleration, the geodesics generally represent the straightest path between two points in a curved spacetime.

The differential geodesic equation

On an n-dimensional Riemannian manifold , the geodesic equation written in a coordinate chart with coordinates  is:

The Christoffel symbols are functions of the metric and are given by:

where the comma indicates a partial derivative with respect to the coordinates:

As the manifold has dimension , the geodesic equations are a system of  ordinary differential equations for the  coordinate variables. Thus, allied with initial conditions, the system can, according to the Picard–Lindelöf theorem, be solved.  One can also use a Lagrangian approach to the problem: defining

and applying the Euler–Lagrange equation.

Heuristics

As the laws of physics can be written in any coordinate system, it is convenient to choose one that simplifies the geodesic equations. Mathematically, this means a coordinate chart is chosen in which the geodesic equations have a particularly tractable form.

Effective potentials

When the geodesic equations can be separated into terms containing only an undifferentiated variable and terms containing only its derivative, the former may be consolidated into an effective potential dependent only on position. In this case, many of the heuristic methods of analysing energy diagrams apply, in particular the location of turning points.

Solution techniques

Solving the geodesic equations means obtaining an exact solution, possibly even the general solution, of the geodesic equations. Most attacks secretly employ the point symmetry group of the system of geodesic equations. This often yields a result giving a family of solutions implicitly, but in many examples does yield the general solution in explicit form.

Because timelike geodesics are maximal, one may apply the Euler–Lagrange equation directly, and thus obtain a set of equations equivalent to the geodesic equations. This method has the advantage of bypassing a tedious calculation of Christoffel symbols.

See also
Geodesics of the Schwarzschild vacuum
Mathematics of general relativity
Transition from special relativity to general relativity

References

 
 
 

General relativity
Mathematical methods in general relativity